The Syntomini are a tribe of moths in the family Erebidae. The tribe was erected by Gottlieb August Wilhelm Herrich-Schäffer in 1846.

Taxonomy
The tribe used to be classified in the subfamily Ctenuchinae of the family Arctiidae.

The wingspan of a Syntomini is about 11-14 millimeters. Their abdomen can wither be completely yellow or be black with a band of yellow around it.

Genera
The following genera are included in the tribe.

Amata Fabricius, 1807
Anapisa Kiriakoff, 1952
Apisa Walker, 1855
Auriculoceryx Holloway, 1988
Automolis Hübner, 1819
Balacra Walker, 1856
Bergeria Kiriakoff, 1952
Cacosoma (Boisduval, 1847)
Caeneressa Obraztsov, 1957
Ceryx Wallengren, 1863
Dysauxes Hübner, [1819]
Eressa Walker, 1854
Gippius Walker, 1855
Hippurarctia Kiriakoff, 1953
Meganaclia Aurivillius, 1892
Melisa Walker, 1854
Melisoides Strand, 1912
Metamicroptera Hulstaert, 1923
Metarctia Walker, 1855
Microbergeria Kiriakoff, 1972
Nacliodes Strand, 1912
Neobalacra Kiriakoff, 1952
Neophemula Kiriakoff, 1957
Oligamatites Kusnetzov, 1928
Owambarctia Kiriakoff, 1957
Paramelisa Aurivillius, 1906
Pseudmelisa Hampson, 1910
Pseudodiptera Kaye, 1918
Pseudothyretes Dufrane, 1945
Rhipidarctia Kiriakoff, 1953
Streptophlebia Hampson, 1898
Syntomoides Hampson, 1893
Thyretes Boisduval, 1847
Trichaetoides Holloway, 1988

References

 
Arctiinae
Moth tribes